This is a timeline documenting events of Jazz in the year 1990.

Events

April
 6 – The 17th Vossajazz started in Voss, Norway (April 6 – 8).

May
 23 – The 18th Nattjazz started in Bergen, Norway (May 23 – June 3).

June
 1 – The 19th Moers Festival started in Moers, Germany (June 1 – 4).

July
 7 – 24th Montreux Jazz Festival started in Switzerland (July 7 – 22).
 12 – The 15th North Sea Jazz Festival started in The Hague (July 12 – 15).

August
 17 – The 7th Brecon Jazz Festival started in Brecon, Wales (April 17 – 19).

September
 21 – The 33rd Monterey Jazz Festival started in Monterey, California (September 21 – 23).

Unknown date
 Eliane Elias and Randy Brecker was divorced.

Album releases

Ben Sidran: Cool Paradise
Bill Frisell: Is That You?
Bobby Previte: Empty Suits
Butch Morris: Dust To Dust
Charlie Haden: Dream Keeper
Danny Gottlieb: Brooklyn Blues
David Liebman: The Tree
David Ware: Great Bliss
Don Pullen: Random Thoughts
Egberto Gismondi: Infancia
Elements: Spirit River
Eric Reed: Soldier's Hymn
Eliane Elias: Eliane Elias Plays Jobim
Franz Koglmann: The Use of Memory
Geri Allen: The Nurturer
Gerry Hemingway: Down To The Wire
Gerry Hemingway: Special Detail
Hank Roberts: Birds Of Prey
ICP Orchestra: Bospaadje Konijnehol II
Jazz Passengers: Implement Yourself
John Pizzarelli: My Blue Heaven
John Zorn: Naked City
Keith Tippett: The Journey
Kenny Wheeler: Music for Large & Small Ensembles
Kenny Wheeler: Widow in the Window
Marilyn Crispell: Overlapping Hands: Eight Segments
Mark Helias: Attack the Future
Marty Ehrlich: Emergency Peace
Matthew Shipp: Circular Temple
Michael Formanek: Wide Open Spaces
Michael Franks: Blue Pacific
Muhal Richard Abrams: Blu Blu Blu
Music Revelation Ensemble: Elec Jazz
Myra Melford: Jump
Philip Catherine: I Remember You
Phil Woods: All Bird's Children
Ray Anderson: What Because
Terence Blanchard: Terence Blanchard
Tom Harrell: Form
Yellowjackets: Green House

Deaths

 January
 3 – Peter van Steeden, Dutch-American composer (born 1904).
 8 – Georgie Auld, Canadian tenor saxophonist, clarinetist, and bandleader (born 1919).
 9 – Buschi Niebergall, German free jazz musician (born 1938).

 February
 2 – Mel Lewis, American drummer and bandleader (born 1929).
 4 – Fritz Schulz-Reichel, German pianist (born 1912).
 5 – King Perry, American saxophonist, clarinetist, arranger, and bandleader (born 1914).
 21 – John Madrid, American trumpeter  (born 1948).
 27 – Arthur Österwall, Swedish band leader, composer, vocalist, and upright bassist (born 1910).
 28 – Russell Jacquet, American trumpeter (born 1917).

 March
 12 – Harry South, English pianist, composer, and arranger (born 1929).
 17 – Jack Noren, American drummer and vocalist (born 1929).
 23 – Al Sears, American tenor saxophonist and bandleader (born 1910).

 April
 3 – Sarah Vaughan, American singer (born 1924).
 5 – Louis Nelson, American trombonist (born 1902).
 25 – Dexter Gordon, American tenor saxophonist (born 1923).

 May
 4 – Emily Remler, American guitarist (born 1957).
 7 – Elizete Cardoso, Argentine singer and actress (born 1920).
 16 – Sammy Davis, Jr., American singer and entertainer (born 1925).
 17 – Frank Wright, American tenor saxophonist (born 1935).
 18
 Eje Thelin, Swedish trombonist (born 1938).
 Sing Miller, American pianist (born 1914).
 26 – Chris McGregor, South African pianist, bandleader, and composer (born 1936).

 June
 2 – Walter Davis Jr., American pianist (born 1932).
 7 – Lou Blackburn, American trombonist (born 1922).
 10 – Hubert Rostaing, Algierian-French clarinetist and tenor saxophonist (born 1918).
 11 – Clyde McCoy, American trumpeter (born 1903).
 21 – June Christy, American singer (born 1925).
 28 – Howard Roberts, American guitarist (born 1929).
 30 – Dudu Pukwana, South African saxophonist, composer, and pianist (born 1938).

 July
 21 – Joe Turner, American pianist (born 1907).
 31 – Lowell Davidson, American pianist (born 1941).

 August
 12 – Harry Leahey, American guitarist (born 1935).
 14 – Chester Zardis, American upright bassist (born 1900).
 17 – Pearl Bailey, American actress and singer (born 1918).

 September
 3 – Betty Glamann, American jazz harpist (born 1923).
 23 – George Desmond Hodnett, Irish composer, piano, trumpet, and zither player (born 1918).
 29 – Freddie Kohlman, American drummer, vocalist, and bandleader (born 1918).

 October
 1 – Phil Napoleon, American trumpeter and bandleader (born 1901).
 5 – Sam Taylor, American tenor saxophonist (born 1916).
 6 – Asser Fagerström, Finnish pianist, composer, and actor ((born 1912).
 16 – Art Blakey, American drummer and bandleader, The Jazz Messengers (born 1919).
 25 – Major Holley, American upright bassist (born 1914).
 27 – Xavier Cugat, bandleader (born 1900).

 November
 4 – William Leavitt, American guitarist and arranger (born 1925).
 16 – Lee Castle, American trumpeter and bandleader (born 1915).
 26
 Dave Wilkins, Barbadian trumpeter (born 1914).
 Rita Ora, British singer-songwriter and actor.

 December
 5 – Bill Hardman, American trumpeter and flugelhornist (born 1933).
 18 – Bernard Addison, American guitarist (born 1905).

 Unknown date
 Francis Coppieters, Belgian pianist (born 1930).

Births

 January
 17 – Diknu Schneeberger, Austrian guitarist.

 February
 13 – Jonathan Chua, Singaporean drummer.

 March
 27 – Kimbra Lee Johnson, New Zealand singer and actress.

 April
 20 – Sebastian Nordström, Swedish bassist.

 July
 11 – Ole Mofjell, Norwegian drummer.
 23 – Torgeir Standal, Norwegian guitarist.

 August
 15 – Benjamin Kheng, Singaporean guitarist/pianist/composer and brony.

 September
 15 – Laura Jurd, British trumpet and synthesizer player.

 October
 25
 Austin Peralta, American pianist. At age 15, a featured performer at the 2006 Tokyo Jazz Festival (died 2012).
 Marthe Wang, Norwegian singer and songwriter.

 November
 27 – Mette Henriette, Norwegian saxophonist, improviser, and autodidact composer.

 December
 20 – Corrie Dick, Scottish drummer, percussionist, vocalist, and composer.
 25 – Sandra Riley Tang, Singaporean female double-bassist.

 Unknown date
 Alper Tuzcu, Turkish singer, composer, and music producer.
 Charlotte Dos Santos, Norwegian vocalist, composer, and arranger.
 Martin Masakowski, American bassist.

See also

 1990s in jazz
 List of years in jazz
 1990 in music

References

External links 
 History Of Jazz Timeline: 1990 at All About Jazz

Jazz
Jazz by year